Joseph August Eduard Friedrich Glæser (November 25, 1835 in Berlin – September 29, 1891 in Hillerød) was a Danish composer and organist.

Notable works
Høje Nord, Friheds Hjem (1869)
duets
firstemmige mandssange 
some hymn tunes
and oratorio (1858)
piano pieces for 2 or 4 hands
Alle mulige Roller (1857)
Gildet paa Solhaug (1861)
En gammel Soldat 
Jægerne (skuespil 1860)
et treakts-syngestykke
Fjernt fra Danmark (ballet 1860)
Droslen slog i Skov sin klare Trille (romance 1857)
Velkommen lærkelil

See also
List of Danish composers

References
This article was initially translated from Danish Wikipedia

External links
 

Male composers
Danish classical organists
Male classical organists
1835 births
1891 deaths
Musicians from Berlin
19th-century Danish composers
19th-century German musicians
19th-century male musicians
19th-century organists